The Stourbridge News is a local free newspaper which serves the Stourbridge area of the West Midlands, England, circulating in the town itself and the surrounding communities of Amblecote, Hagley, Lye, Pedmore, and Wordsley. Originally The County Express, it has been in circulation since February 1985, and has an approximate readership of 55,000.

Staff and journalists
Past journalists include Lyn Alderson who was a journalist for over 20 years. Another journalist that had longevity with the paper was Dennis Elwell. He spent 30 years at the Stourbridge News. He died in 2014 aged 84.

References

External links

Stourbridge
Newspapers published in the West Midlands (county)
Newspapers published by Newsquest